Manic Panic may refer to:

 Manic Panic (brand), a line of cosmetic hair coloring
 Manic Panic (album), a 1996 album by Leila K